Vivekanandan Krishnaveni Sasikala (born 18 August 1954), also known by her married name Sasikala Natarajan, and often referred to by her initials VKS, is an Indian politician. She was a close associate of J. Jayalalithaa, the late chief minister of Tamil Nadu, who headed the All India Anna Dravida Munnetra Kazhagam (AIADMK) from 1989 until her death in 2016. After Jayalalithaa's death, the party's general council elected her as a temporary secretary general of AIADMK. Before entering the Central Prison in Bangalore, Sasikala appointed Edappadi K. Palanisamy as Chief Minister of Tamil Nadu. Palanisamy and other ministers removed her from the post and expelled her from the party in September 2017. Her dismissal was upheld in April 2022.

After her expulsion she went to court over her dismissal as AIADMK general secretary. Her nephew T. T. V. Dhinakaran launched Amma Makkal Munnettra Kazhagam in March 2018, with Sasikala as its general secretary. Dhinakaran replaced her in April 2019.

In February 2017, a two-bench Supreme Court jury pronounced Sasikala guilty and ordered her immediate arrest in a disproportionate-assets case, in which Jayalalithaa was also involved, effectively ending Sasikala's chief ministerial ambitions. She was released in January 2021.

Personal life 
Sasikala was born on 18 August 1954 to C. Vivekanandam and V. Krishnaveni in Thiruthuraipoondi, located in the present-day Tiruvarur district. Her parents belonged to an influential Kallar family and later moved to Mannargudi.

She had four brothers: V. K. Dhivakaran, T. V. Sundaravadanam (died in 2020), Vinodhagan (died in 1993) and V. Jayaraman (died in 1991); and one sister, B. Vanithamani (died in 2011). Her marriage to Maruthappa Natarajan in 1973 was presided over by DMK leader M. Karunanidhi. Natarajan died on 20 March 2018. The two did not have any children.

Career

All India Anna Dravida Munnetra Kazhagam 

Sasikala's husband was a public relations officer in the government of Tamil Nadu, who worked closely with the district collector of South Arcot, V. S. Chandralekha, who in turn was very close to Tamil Nadu chief minister M. G. Ramachandran. These connections helped introduce Sasikala to J. Jayalalithaa, who was the propaganda secretary of the All India Anna Dravida Munnetra Kazhagam (AIADMK) at the time. Since Sasikala helped cover video of party meetings and distribution of policies of AIADMK through CDs, a friendship developed between the two and they became very close.

Sasikala became the person most trusted by Jayalalithaa. After Ramachandran's death and the public humiliation of Jayalalithaa by AIADMK cadres who assaulted her at the funeral, Sasikala brought her relatives and 40 other people from Mannargudi for Jayalalithaa's protection. Jayalalithaa took control of AIADMK from Ramachandran's widow V. N. Janaki, and Sasikala moved into her Poes Garden residence in 1989. After Jayalalithaa became chief minister following the 1991 legislative assembly election, Sasikala's power and influence greatly increased, so much so that she was even more powerful than Jayalalithaa herself and the state ministers took orders directly from her.

In 1995, the wedding for Sasikala's nephew V. N. Sudhakaran was held and generated significant controversy due to the extravagant display of wealth, with many people believing that the AIADMK government was significantly corrupt. Subramanian Swamy filed corruption cases against Jayalalithaa and her aides. The AIADMK lost the 1996 legislative election, particularly due to Sasikala's display of her expensive jewelry. Jayalalithaa had adopted Sudhakaran in 1995, but disowned him in 1996.

P. Chidambaram, who had promised to hold Jayalalithaa and Sasikala accountable, had the latter investigated after assuming the position of finance minister for the union government in June 1996, leading to her arrest under the Foreign Exchange Regulation Act. Jayalalithaa distanced herself from Sasikala, but the two restored their friendship after Sasikala refused to implicate her and was released after ten months in prison.

AIADMK helped bring Atal Bihari Vajpayee to power after the 1998 general election. In 1999, Sasikala helped organise a tea party for Swamy, who was upset with Vajpayee for not giving him the position of a cabinet minister. The party was attended by Jayalalithaa and Indian National Congress leader Sonia Gandhi. The AIADMK helped bring down Vajpayee's government within a few days as AIADMK withdrew its support from the coalition headed by him.

On 19 December 2011, Jayalalithaa expelled Sasikala and 13 others, including Sasikala's husband, M. Natarajan, her nephew T. T. V. Dhinakaran, their relatives, and Jayalalithaa's foster son V. N. Sudhakaran from the AIADMK. This act of Jayalalithaa's was considered a way to prove that she was not under the influence of Sasikala and her family. The matter was resolved by 31 March 2012, when Sasikala was reinstated as a party member after issuing a written apology.

In a meeting held on 29 December 2016 – the first meeting after Jayalalithaa's death on 5 December 2016 – the AIADMK General Council appointed Sasikala as the party's temporary general secretary until a formal election was held for the post.

On 5 February 2017, Sasikala was unanimously elected as the AIADMK Legislature Party Leader by a meeting of all the MLAs in the party. Tamil Nadu governor C. Vidyasagar Rao accepted the resignation of Chief Minister O. Panneerselvam on 6 February, and instructed him to continue functioning as acting chief minister "until alternate arrangements are made". The governor delayed announcing Sasikala as the new Chief Minister, waiting for the verdict of the disproportionate assets case against her. On 14 February 2017, Sasikala was convicted and sentenced to four years in Bangalore's Parappana Agrahara Jail and was given 24 hours to surrender. The governor rejected her claims to become chief minister. Sasikala then convened the party's MLA council in her capacity as the general secretary, where Edappadi K. Palaniswami was unanimously appointed as the new chief minister and sworn in the next day.

Expulsion from AIADMK 
On 21 August 2017, it was reported that the AIADMK faction loyal to Palaniswami had decided to merge with Panneerselvam's splinter faction and expelled Sasikala as the general secretary as one of the key demands of the merger. It was reported on 28 August that Sasikala had been expelled during a party meeting, but this was later denied.

On 13 September, the AIADMK General Council cancelled Sasikala's appointment as interim general secretary and expelled her from the party, though officials appointed to party posts by her were allowed to continue their duties. Instead, the late Jayalalithaa was named the eternal general secretary of AIADMK. Sasikala filed a case in the City Civil Court IV of Chennai in February 2021, but it upheld her dismissal as the AIADMK general secretary in April 2022. On 11 July, Palaniswami succeeded her as the interim general secretary of the party at a general council meeting.

Among the resolutions passed during Sasikala's expulsion, the AIADMK declared that her appointment as general secretary was disputable and as such, T. T. V. Dhinakaran's appointment as Deputy General Secretary as well as his decisions were cancelled.

Imprisonment and return to politics 
The expulsion of Sasikala and her family led to the creation of the Amma Makkal Munnettra Kahzagam (AMMK) on 15 March 2018 by T. T. V. Dhinakaran. Sasikala held the post of general secretary until 19 April 2019 when Dhinakaran was elected to the position. He stated that she would function as the party's president after her release from jail in a disproportionate assets case.

After being released from jail, Sasikala announced her intention to return to active politics in February 2021, but announced a change of mind on 3 March. She did not support Dhinakaran when he decided that the AMMK would participate in the 2021 Tamil Nadu Legislative Assembly election alone. After her release from jail, Panneerselvam was open to letting Sasikala back into the AIADMK, but was opposed by Palaniswami.

Sasikala confirmed in May 2021 that she would return to active politics. She later attempted to regain her political influence and released audio tapes on social media, calling on people to bring in a government modelled after Jayalalithaa's policies and push out "enemies and traitors". She also claimed that she stayed away from the AIADMK so Palaniswami and Panneerselvam would win the local elections and promised to unite the disputing factions of the party.

Dhinakaran stated in July 2021 that Sasikala was trying to reclaim the AIADMK by winning over its cadres. On 17 October she claimed that she was still the general secretary of AIADMK, and called on the party to unite for its sake as well as of the people. On 26 June 2022, she began a political tour claiming that she was trying to protect the AIADMK.

After the expulsion of Panneerselvam from AIADMK in July 2022 and Palaniswami becoming the interim general secretary of the party, Sasikala denounced Palaniswami's appointment to the position as invalid, and stated that he did not have any authority to expel Panneerselvam, while also claiming that the party cadres wanted her to become the general secretary. After his expulsion was overturned by the Madras High Court in August 2022, Panneerselvam stated that he would meet with Sasikala and Dhinakaran to unite the AIADMK.

A commission probing Jayalalithaa's death recommended investigating Sasikala and others in a report submitted to the state government on 27 August.

Conviction 

The three were sentenced to a four-year jail term, restoring in toto her earlier conviction in the case delivered on 27 September 2014. She and her relatives were sentenced to a four-year jail term with a fine of  each. The judgment stipulated that she and her accomplices would serve an additional 12 months in prison if they failed to pay the fine.

The Supreme Court refused her plea to surrender after a fortnight and to be allowed to have food from home, so Sasikala and Ilavarasi presented themselves for imprisonment on 15 February 2017. She was released on 27 January 2021 after her term elapsed, but was kept at Victoria Hospital to be treated for COVID-19. Her conviction in the case made her ineligible from participating in an election until 27 January 2027.

References

External links
 

1954 births
Living people
21st-century Indian politicians
21st-century Indian women politicians
All India Anna Dravida Munnetra Kazhagam politicians
Businesswomen from Tamil Nadu
Criminals from Tamil Nadu
Indian money launderers
Indian politicians convicted of corruption
Indian politicians convicted of crimes
Indian politicians disqualified from office
Indian prisoners and detainees
People from Tiruvarur district
Women in Tamil Nadu politics